Selene was the personification of the Moon in Greek mythology.  

Selene may also refer to:

Astronomy
 Selene, another name for the Moon of Earth
580 Selene, a minor planet orbiting the sun

Animals
 Selene (fish), a genus of fishes in the family Carangidae
 Actias selene, a species of moth

Characters 

Selene (Underworld), a character in the film Underworld
Selene (comics), a Marvel Comics supervillain
 Selene, an alias used by Lanfear in Robert Jordan's Wheel of Time series
 Adam Selene, a character in Robert Heinlein's The Moon Is a Harsh Mistress
Selene (Cro character), fictional sabre-toothed tiger in TV series Cro
 Selene Lindstrom, a character in Isaac Asimov's novel The Gods Themselves

Music 

 Selene, an album by musician Max Tannone
 Selene, a song in Imagine Dragons' album Night Visions
My Selene, a song by Finnish power metal band Sonata Arctica in the  album Reckoning Night

People 

Selene (given name), the name
Cleopatra Selene II, the daughter of Cleopatra

Places 

 Selene, Queensland, a locality in the North Burnett Region, Queensland, Australia

 Selene (building), a skyscraper in New York City

Vehicles
 SELENE (also named Kaguya), a Japanese lunar orbiter
 HMS Selene (P254), a 1944 British submarine
 Ghia Selene, a 1959 concept car from the Ghia design studio

Other uses
 Ethinylestradiol/cyproterone acetate, a birth control pill

See also
 Similar names Silene (disambiguation), Celina (disambiguation), Celine, Selina, Selena
 Celene (Greyhawk), a nation in the fictional World of Greyhawk in Dungeons & Dragons
 Celene, a moon of the fictional planet Oerth
 Selen (disambiguation)
 Selenium, the chemical element named after the Greek word "selene" meaning "moon"